Ernesto Enrique Labarthe Flores (born June 2, 1956 in Lima, Peru) is a Peruvian retired footballer who played as a midfielder.

Club career
The son of Sport Boys's president, Labarthe began his professional football career with Sport Boys. After impressing for the Peruvian club, he signed for Monterrey in Mexico for the 1980–81 season. After scoring twice in three matches, Labarthe lost his place in the side and only made three further appearances for Monterrey before leaving the club. After returning to play in Peru, he had another brief stint abroad with Palestino in Chile.

International career
He was a non-playing squad member at the 1978 FIFA World Cup.

Personal
Labarthe's son, Gianfranco, is also a professional footballer.

References

External links

Profile at As Profile at

1956 births
Living people
Footballers from Lima
Association football forwards
Peruvian footballers
Peru international footballers
Sport Boys footballers
C.F. Monterrey players
Club Deportivo Palestino footballers
1978 FIFA World Cup players
Peruvian expatriate footballers
Expatriate footballers in Chile
Expatriate footballers in Mexico